is a passenger railway station in located in the city of Tanabe, Wakayama Prefecture, Japan, operated by West Japan Railway Company (JR West).

Lines

Station layout
The station consists of one side platform and one island platform connected to the station building by a footbridge. The station has a Midori no Madoguchi staffed ticket office.

Platforms

Adjacent stations

|-
!colspan=5|West Japan Railway Company (JR West)

History
Kii-Tanabe Station opened on November 8, 1932. With the privatization of the Japan National Railways (JNR) on April 1, 1987, the station came under the aegis of the West Japan Railway Company.

Passenger statistics
In fiscal 2019, the station was used by an average of 1364 passengers daily (boarding passengers only).

Surrounding Area
 Tanabe City Tourist Center
 Kii-Tanabe station square shopping street
 Tanabe City Hall
 Wakayama District Court Tanabe Branch
 Tokei Shrine

See also
List of railway stations in Japan

References

External links

  Kii-Tanabe Station (West Japan Railway) 

Railway stations in Wakayama Prefecture
Railway stations in Japan opened in 1932
Tanabe, Wakayama